The FIS Snowboarding World Championships 1996 took place between January 24th and January 28th in Lienz, Austria.

Results

Men's results

Giant Slalom

Parallel Slalom

Halfpipe

Women's Events

Giant Slalom

Parallel Slalom

Halfpipe

Medal table

References

1996
1996 in Austrian sport
1996 in snowboarding